This is a list of bus companies in Indonesia.

In Indonesia, long-distance buses are categorized into 2 types, namely "intercity bus within the province" ( or AKDP) and "intercity interprovince bus" (Antarkota Antarprovinsi or AKAP).

Inter-city buses 
 Akas Group
 PMTOH
 Pahala Kencana
 PO ANS
 PO EZRI
 PO Lorena
 PO Gumarang Jaya
 PO NPM
 PO Rajawali
 PO Siliwangi Antar Nusa
 PO Coyo
 PO Surya Bali
 PO Rasa Sayang
 PO Putra Jaya
 Perum DAMRI
 PT Antar Lintas Sumatera
 PT Continental Megah Express
 Sumber Group
 PO Haryanto
 Sinar Jaya
 Sudiro Tungga Jaya
 Bejeu
 Shantika
 Nusantara
 Borlindo
 Primadona
 Kapuas Raya
 Pulau Indah Jaya
 Sempati Star
 PT Putra Pelangi Perkasa
 PO Yessoe Travel
 PT Trans Agung Mulia
 and others

Bus rapid transit
 Batik Solo Trans (Surakarta)
 BRT Depok (Depok)
 Trans Bandar Lampung (Bandar Lampung)
 Trans Banyumas (Banyumas)
 Trans Metro Bandung (Bandung)
 BRT Banjarbakula (Banjarmasin)
 Trans Metro Batam (Batam)
 Trans Cirebon (Cirebon)
 Trans Semanggi Suroboyo (Surabaya)
 Trans Jayapura (Jayapura)
 Trans Jateng (Central Java)
 Trans Jatim (East Java)
 Trans Jogja (Yogyakarta)
 Trans Koetaradja (Banda Aceh)
 Trans Kota Tangerang (Tangerang)
 Trans Mamminasata (Makassar)
 Trans Mebidang (Medan)
 Trans Metro Bandung (Bandung)
 Trans Metro Deli (Medan)
 Trans Metro Dewata (Bali)
 Trans Metro Pasundan (Bandung)
 Trans Metro Pekanbaru (Pekanbaru)
 Trans Metro Pontianak (Pontianak)
 Trans Musi (Palembang)
 Trans Padang (Padang)
 Trans Patriot (Bekasi)
 Trans Pakuan (Bogor)
 Trans Palangka Raya (Palangka Raya)
 Trans Sarbagita (Denpasar)
 Trans Semarang (Semarang)
 TransJakarta (Jakarta)
 Trans Lulo (Kendari)

City buses company

 Bianglala (Jakarta)
 Koantas Bima (Jakarta)
 Kopaja (Jakarta)
 Kopkarmi (Yogyakarta)
 Mayasari Bhakti (Jakarta)
 Metro Mini (Jakarta)
 Perum DAMRI (Jakarta)
 Perum PPD (Jakarta)
 Steady Safe (Jakarta)
 and others

Passenger and freighter
 Hiba Group
 Perum DAMRI

References

 
Indonesia